The Asthenic Syndrome is a 1989 Soviet drama film directed by Kira Muratova. It is the sixth feature film directed by Muratova, and arguably her masterpiece, most important film and best known film.  The film was entered into the 40th Berlin International Film Festival where it won the Silver Bear - Special Jury Prize. It also won 1991 Nika Award in Russia.

Plot
The film consists of two parts: the first part is shot in black-and-white and the second in color.

In the first part Natasha, the main character, was in her husband's funeral when she suddenly lost control over her states of extreme rage and despair. She walked away from the funeral and began to treat everybody provocatively and aggressively. After resigning from the hospital where she was a doctor and twice unsuccessfully seeking for sex with random people, Natasha finally regained herself and was able to accept an act of kindness from a stranger.

We then realize that the first part was a film screening in a theater as the second part starts. Shot in color, the second part has its protagonist an exhausted and disillusioned school teacher Nikolai who fell asleep at the screening of the black-and-white film. The audience ignores the screener's plea to stay for the Q&A with the film’s actress ("Olga Serghjevna") and leave the theater disorderly and raucously. (Muratova ironically mocks the general public’s response to her own films.) This sleeping schoolteacher awakens and leaves the theatre, but falls asleep again in the overcrowded subway and then at a meeting at school. The film suggests that as a result of personal predicaments and problems at work Nikolai has gotten the Asthenic Syndrome – he falls asleep at the most inappropriate times. (“Asthenia” means “a lack of strength, diminution of vital power, weakness, debility,” according to the OED.) He is admitted to the hospital for the mentally ill where he gains the understanding that the people around him there are not any crazier than those who live in freedom. After some time he is released and he ends up falling asleep on the subway. The empty wagon takes away the sleeping man into a dark tunnel.

Cast
 Olga Antonova as Natalia Ivanovna
 Sergei Popov as Nikolai Alekseevich
 Galina Zakhurdayeva as Masha (Blonde)
 Natalya Buzko as Masha (Brunette)
 Aleksandra Svenskaya as Teacher
 Pavel Polishchuk as Iunikov
 Natalya Ralleva as Mother
 Galina Kasperovich as Nikolai's Wife
 Viktor Aristov as School Principal
 Nikolai Semyonov as Head Doctor
 Oleg Shkolnik as the owner of the canaries
 Vera Storozheva as secretary
 Aleksandr Chernykh as episode
 Leonid Kushnir as a patient
 Galina Stakhanova  as   doctor of the Moscow metro

Theme and style 
Masha Sotskaya writes in The Legacy Of Kira Muratova’s “The Asthenic Syndrome”  thatThe Asthenic Syndrome, often described as “the last Soviet and the first post-Soviet film”, begins with depiction of a black-and-white drama centered on a recently widowed woman and her desperate and self destructive protests against the world. This section concludes quickly and is revealed to be part of a Post-Modern film-within-a film sequence , and as the images change from black-and-white to color the scene shifts to a crowded cinema screening this black-and-white movie. The films of consists of two parts that are barely connected. This technique is one that Muratova has used in many of her films over the decades.Film scholar Jane A. Taubman sees in many "unpleasant" scenes an attempt by the directors to lead the audience out of the "moral apathy" in which Soviet society finds itself in its last years. She compares the image of nudity with the film Save and Protect by Alexander Sokurov. The era of glasnost, Taubman believes, begins with Tengiz Abuladze's Repentance and ends with Asthenic syndrome. In her review, she concludes that the film is the most important achievement in the work of Kira Muratova, but the means and message presented by the director preclude its commercial success. She writes, in her survey article The Cinema of Kira Muratova, that ... her most important film, Asthenic Syndrome, made in 1989 and released in early 1990. Two-and-one-half hours long and extremely complex stylistically and thematically, .... The medical syndrome from which the film takes its title is a condition of absolute physical and psychological exhaustion, a metaphor for Soviet society in its final years. The hero, Nikolai, a secondary school teacher (Sergei Popov), keeps falling asleep at inappropriate moments, such as a parent-teacher meeting. But his narcolepsy is a psychological defense against a world whose moral degradation has become unbearable. Though the horrors with which Muratova assaults her viewer were those of contemporary Soviet society,...

Asthenic Syndrom expressed deep despair at and moral disintegration of Soviet personal and public life. Those who could not, or would not, see the prophetic, Tolstoyan moral vision in the film tarred it epithet "chernukha," a new slang word for "an excessively black depiction of reality....

Asthenic syndrome ... used an aesthetic that Muratova finds intriguing: "the aesthetic of garbage, trash, eclectic combinations of rubbish, but the construction site expresses laconically what I have in mind." Critic Andrei Plakhov has the look of this film as "contemporary kitsch, picturesque sots-art [growing out of] the atmosphere of our towns and hamlets, and their continual construction sites: building, unfinished-building, re-building, migration of masses of humanity, the interface between village and city, the traditional neglect of public culture and the poetic cult of the romance of the road. ... A kind of socialist Desert."About the Tolstoyan moral vision mentioned above, Muratova also states that I could dedicate this film to Tolstoy. This is the key to my film. He says things about the naivety of the intelligentsia who believe culture and art can transform the world… I believe we can only draw attention, provoke, make people think. Try to refine the soul and raise the mental level. But the essence of what is inside cannot be changed. This film is a tragedy consecrated to that fact.

Reception 
The film was awarded two prizes: Nika Award (Best Feature Film 1991), Special Jury Prize at the Berlin Film Festival (1990); in addition, the film received four nominations.

In the press of the 90s, the film was often considered a criticism of Soviet reality , but Oleg Kovalov does not agree with this opinion. The critic notes in the film the presence of an "internal monologue" expressed by reading excerpts from the work written by the main character - the teacher, comparing this aspect with Federico Fellini's 8½. American critic Jonathan Rosenbaum argues that Asthenic Syndrome "breaks all the usual rules" of cinema, and also calls it a "masterpiece of glasnost cinema."

References

External links

1989 films
1989 crime drama films
Soviet drama films
1980s Russian-language films
Films directed by Kira Muratova
Films partially in color
Silver Bear Grand Jury Prize winners